Parapales is a genus of parasitic flies in the family Tachinidae.

Species
Parapales brevicornis Mesnil, 1977
Parapales brunnea Mesnil, 1977
Parapales luteicornis Mesnil, 1977
Parapales micronychia Mesnil, 1977
Parapales pallidula (Mesnil, 1950)
Parapales pectinipes Mesnil, 1977

Distribution
Madagascar

References

Diptera of Africa
Exoristinae
Insects of Madagascar
Tachinidae genera